Triviella is a genus of small sea snails, marine gastropod molluscs in the family Triviidae, the trivias.

Species
Species within the genus Triviella include:

 Triviella amaryllis Schilder, 1925
 Triviella aperta (Swainson, 1822)
 Triviella calvariola (Kilburn, 1980)
 Triviella carptima Fehse, 2016
 Triviella chiapponii Fehse, 2016
 Triviella costata (Gmelin, 1791)
 Triviella debruini (Lorenz, 1994)
 Triviella eratoides (Liltved, 1986)
 Triviella franziskae Fehse & Massier, 2000
 Triviella goslineri (Liltved & Millard, 1994)
 Triviella immelmani Rosenberg & Finley, 2001
 Triviella insolita Fehse & Grego, 2007
 Triviella khanya (Liltved, 1986)
 Triviella lemaitrei (Liltved, 1986)
 Triviella lorenzi Fehse, 2016
 Triviella lowtheri Beals, 2008
 Triviella magnidentata (Liltved, 1986)
 Triviella martybealsi Fehse, 2016
 Triviella massieri (Martin & Poppe, 1991)
 Triviella millardi (Cate, 1979)  (nomen dubium)
 Triviella montorum Fehse, 2016
 Triviella multicostata (Liltved, 1986)
 Triviella neglecta Schilder, 1930
 Triviella ovulata (Lamarck, 1811)
 Triviella phalacra Schilder, 1930
 † Triviella pompholugota (Tate, 1890) 
 Triviella pseudovulata Schilder & M. Schilder, 1929
 Triviella rubra (Shaw, 1909)
 Triviella sanctispiritus (Shikama, 1974)
 Triviella sharonae (Hayes, 1993)
 Triviella splendidissima Tomlin, Schilder & M. Schilder, 1934
 Triviella verhoefi (Gosliner & Liltved, 1981)
 Triviella vesicularis (Gaskoin, 1836)
 Triviella williami Fehse, 2006

Species brought into synonymy
 Triviella gamma Mestayer, 1927: synonym of Pusula pediculus (Linnaeus, 1758)
 Triviella maoriensis Mestayer, 1927: synonym of Ellatrivia merces (Iredale, 1924)
 Triviella memorata Finlay, 1926: synonym of Ellatrivia merces (Iredale, 1924)
 Triviella merces Iredale, 1924: synonym of Ellatrivia merces (Iredale, 1924)
 Triviella porcellio Cate, 1979: synonym of Triviella neglecta Schilder, 1930
 Triviella virginiae (Liltved, 1986): synonym of Triviella vesicularis (Gaskoin, 1836)

References

Further reading
 Fehse D. & Massier W. (2000). "A new Triviella (Gastropoda: Triviidae) from South Africa". La Conchiglia 32(294–295): 123–126.
 Fehse D. (2016). Contributions to the knowledge of the Triviidae, XXX. Revision of the genus Triviella Jousseaume, 1884 (Mollusca: Gastropoda). Acta Conchyliorum. 15: 7-211.

External links

Triviidae